Association football, more commonly known as football or soccer, has been included Military World Games in 1995 as a men's competition sport. Women's football was added to the official program in 2007. The tournament is also a part of the World Military Cup.

Tournaments

Men

Women

Medal table

Overall

Men

Women

See also
 World Military Cup
 African Military Cup
 Americas Military Cup

External links
Military World Cup and Games for men - rsssf.com
Military World Cup and Games for women - rsssf.com

 
Military World Games
World Games